Nebria kratteri kratteri is a subspecies of ground beetle in the Nebriinae subfamily that can be found in Albania, Greece, Italy, and North Macedonia.

References

External links
Nebria kratteri at Carabidae of the World

kratteri kratteri
Beetles described in 1830
Beetles of Europe